Norbert Thelissen (born 19 April 2000) is a Dutch college basketball player for the Utah State Aggies of the Mountain West Conference (MWC). He previously played professionally for the Heroes Den Bosch in the Dutch Basketball League.

Professional career
Thelissen made his debut for Den Bosch in the 2017–18 season, on 26 October 2017 against Aris Leeuwarden.

After the 2019–20 season, Thelissen decided to move back to Heroes Den Bosch U22.

College career
Initially committed to Utah, he switched his commitment to Utah State and therefore will have three years of college eligibility remaining because he played professionally.

Career statistics

College

|-
| style="text-align:left;"| 2021–22
| style="text-align:left;"| Utah State
| 15 || 0 || 2.8 || .400 || .000 || – || .5 || .1 || .1 || .1 || .5

Personal life
Thelissen is majoring in health education and promotion.

References

External links
Utah State Aggies bio

2000 births
Living people
Utah State Aggies men's basketball players
Dutch men's basketball players
Heroes Den Bosch players
Small forwards
Sportspeople from 's-Hertogenbosch